Cathal O'Neill (born 2002) is an Irish hurler who plays for Limerick Junior Championship club Crecora/Manister and at inter-county level with the Limerick senior hurling team. He usually lines out as a centre-forward.

Career

A member of the Crecora/Manister club, O'Neill first came to hurling prominence as a schoolboy with Ardscoil Rís in the Harty Cup.  He made his first appearance on the inter-county scene as a member of the Limerick minor team during the 2018 Munster Championship, ending the provincial campaign as top scorer. O'Neill was again minor top scorer for the provincial championship the following season as he captained the team to their first title in six years. He progressed onto the under-21 team for the 2020 season before being drafted onto the Limerick senior hurling team for the 2021 National League. O'Neill was an unused substitute when Limerick defeated Cork in the 2021 All-Ireland final.

Career statistics

Honours

Dr Harty Cup 
Munster U18.5A Hurling Colleges Championship: 2017/18 

University of Limerick
All-Ireland Freshers' Hurling Championship: 2022

Limerick
All-Ireland Senior Hurling Championship: 2021
Munster Senior Hurling Championship: 2021
Munster Minor Hurling Championship: 2019 (c)

References

2002 births
Living people
Crecora/Manister hurlers
Limerick inter-county hurlers